Bassett House may refer to:

in the United States (by state then city)
Orland P. Bassett House, Hinsdale, Illinois, listed on the National Register of Historic Places (NRHP) in DuPage County
Compton Bassett, Upper Marlboro, Maryland, listed on the NRHP
Maria Bassett House, Arlington, Massachusetts, listed on the NRHP
Edwin Bassett House, Reading, Massachusetts, listed on the NRHP
C.J.H. Bassett House, Taunton, Massachusetts, listed on the NRHP
Dr. Samuel A. Bassett Office and Residence, Richmond Heights, Missouri, listed on the NRHP in St. Louis County
Bassett Lodge and Range Cafe, Bassett, Nebraska, listed on the NRHP
Bassett Family House, Mt. Vision, New York, listed on the NRHP
Bassett House (Durham, North Carolina), listed on the NRHP in Durham County
Bassett and Bassett Banking House, Brenham, Texas, listed on the NRHP in Washington County